Tânia Maria Miranda (born 5 March 1958) is a Brazilian sprinter. She competed in the women's 4 × 400 metres relay at the 1988 Summer Olympics.

References

1958 births
Living people
Athletes (track and field) at the 1979 Pan American Games
Athletes (track and field) at the 1988 Summer Olympics
Brazilian female sprinters
Olympic athletes of Brazil
Place of birth missing (living people)
Pan American Games athletes for Brazil
Olympic female sprinters
21st-century Brazilian women
20th-century Brazilian women